The 1930 Hungarian International Tennis Championships was a tennis tournament played on outdoor clay courts which took place at the Margitsziget courts. It was part of the Hungarian International Tennis Championships series. The event was preceded by two years of promotion, which led to a greater number of foreign participants. As a result of the raised prize money the Hungarian Athletics Club decided to only organize the tournaments while the Hungarian Lawn Tennis Association took over the sponsoring task. The draw was announced on 1st September. The directors were disappointed by the many walkovers, which occurred in the early stages of the competition and the low performance of Hungarian players in overall.

Champions

Men's singles

 Roderich Menzel defeated  Béla von Kehrling; 4–6, 6–3, 6–4, 6–1

Women's singles
 Hilde Krahwinkel Sperling defeated  Anne Peitz; 6–4, 2–6, 8–6

Men's doubles
 Friedrich Rohrer /  Roderich Menzel defeated  Imre Takáts /  Franz Wilhelm Matejka; 7–5, 8–6, 9–7

Women's doubles
 Hilde Krahwinkel Sperling /  Anne Peitz defeated  Simone Barbier  Violette Gallay; 6–3, 7–5

Mixed doubles
 Georges Glasser /  Simone Barbier defeated  Fritz Kuhlmann /  Hilde Krahwinkel Sperling; 5–7, 8–6, 6–4

See also
Hungarian National Tennis Championships

References

Hungarian International Tennis Championships